The Albania national under-15 football team is the national under-15 football team of Albania and is controlled by the Football Association of Albania and was founded in 2009.

History
The Albania under-15 were founded in 2009 for participating in the 2010 Summer Youth Olympics (Football) and the head coach was appointed Sulejman Demollari, former and last native coach of Albania senior side until 2002. Albania under-15 played their first match against Liechtenstein in the semi-final qualification round on 17 October 2009 winning 2–0 with goals scored by Jurgen Vatnikaj and Enes Hoxha. Albania under-15 advanced to the final where they faced Montenegro on 19 October 2009. However, they lost 1–2, missing their participation in the 2010 Summer Youth Olympics finals.

2010 Summer Youth Olympics (Football) qualification round

Squad
COACH:  Sulejman Demollari

The following players participated in the 2010 Summer Youth Olympics (Football) qualification round.

Refoundation
On 25 July 2016 the Albanian Football Association announced to have planned a "reborn" of the Albania under-15 starting with several selection in August, principally for youth talents in Italy on 11 & 12 August and in Greece on 13 August. On 28 September 2016 Albania U-15 had a gathering in the national team training center Kamëz, Tirana, Albania for two days. Alessandro Recenti coach, had accumulated nearly 35 players who were selected from collections made in Greece and Albania. Following the departure of Alessandro Recenti, on 27 January 2017 Albanian Football Association appointed Eqerem Memushi as the under-15 head coach to take the vacant place. Following a 3-months selection in some zones around Albania, on 28 April 2017 an under-15 squad was contoured with 20 players which participated in a 5 days gathering between 9–13 May 2017. A week after, the under-15 team started another gathering in Durrës, Albania between dates 17–19 May 2017 with a squad which contained 21 players. They made their first gathering to play their first matches since refoundation in September 2017 for the double friendly matches against Montenegro U15 on 28 & 30 September 2017. They lost the first match at Reshit Rusi Stadium, Shkodër, Albania 0–4.

Results and fixtures

2017

Players

Current squad
COACH:  Eqerem Memushi

The following players were called up for the double friendly matches against Montenegro U15 on 28 & 30 September 2017.

Recent call-ups
The following players have been called up within the last 12 months.

Coaching staff
Current coaching staff:

Competitive record

Youth Olympic Games

*Denotes draws include knockout matches decided on penalty kicks.

See also
 Albania national football team
 Albania national under-23 football team
 Albania national under-21 football team
 Albania national under-20 football team
 Albania national under-19 football team
 Albania national under-18 football team
 Albania national under-17 football team
 Albania national under-16 football team
 Albania national youth football team
 Albania national football team results
 Albanian Superliga
 Football in Albania
 List of Albania international footballers

References

European national under-15 association football teams
under-15
Football in Albania